Wanderley is a Brazilian surname. The Brazilian family name Vanderlei and Wanderley, now also used as given names, was introduced in Brazil in 1637 by the Dutch cavalry captain Gaspar/Caspar van Niehof van der Leij, who may have been born in Gummersbach.

Notable people with the surname include:
Claudio Wanderley Sarmento Neto (born 1982), Brazilian footballer
Deraldo Wanderley (born 1956), Brazilian volleyball player
Erik Wanderley, Brazilian jiujitsu fighter
Leandro Silva Wanderley (born 1979), Brazilian footballer
Walter Wanderley (1932–1986), Brazilian organist and pianist

Given name
Wanderley (footballer, 1938-2020), full name Wanderley Machado da Silva, Brazilian football forward
Wanderley Alves dos Reis (1945–2012), Brazilian singer-songwriter better known as Wando
Wanderley Paiva (born 1946), Brazilian football coach
Wanderley Alves de Oliveira (born 1959), Brazilian footballer
Wanderley Oliveira (born 1965), Brazilian boxer
Wanderley Magalhães Azevedo (1966–2006), Brazilian cyclist
Wanderley de Jesus Sousa (born 1986), Brazilian footballer better known as Derley
Wanderley (footballer, born 1988), full name Wanderley Santos Monteiro Júnior,  Brazilian football forward

Fictional characters
Travis Wanderley, a character in American Horror Story: Murder House

See also
Vanderlei, a spelling variant of the name
Wanderlei, a spelling variant of the name
Wanderley, Bahia

References